Inktank Storage was the lead development contributor and financial sponsor company behind the open source Ceph distributed file system. Inktank was founded by Sage Weil and Bryan Bogensberger and initially funded by DreamHost, Citrix and Mark Shuttleworth.

On 30 April 2014 it was announced that Red Hat would acquire Inktank Storage for $175 Million.

History 
Inktank was created to offer professional services and support for the open source Ceph storage system. CTO and founder Sage Weil started the open source Ceph project in 2004 for his doctoral dissertation at the University of California, Santa Cruz. In August 2012, Inktank joined the Linux Foundation to further open source technologies such as Ceph. In September 2012, Mark Shuttleworth invested 1 million dollars to help support the progression of Ceph.

Coverage
In July 2012, Inktank was listed in the Infostor 6 Storage Startups to Watch.
In July 2012, Inktank was listed in CRN The 10 Coolest Storage Startups of 2012.
In May 2012, Inktank was listed in CRN 10 Hot Emerging Vendors.

References 

Companies established in 2011
Computer storage companies
Red Hat